The Guaira spiny-rat (Proechimys guairae) is a species of rodent in the family Echimyidae. It is endemic to Venezuela. It is commonly referred to as 'casiragua' to avoid confusion with true rats (Muroidea)

Phylogeny
Morphological characters and mitochondrial cytochrome b DNA sequences showed that P. guairae belongs to the so-called trinitatus group of Proechimys species, and shares closer phylogenetic affinities with the other members of this clade: P. trinitatus, P. mincae, P. poliopus, P. magdalenae, P. chrysaeolus, P. urichi, and P. hoplomyoides.

References

Proechimys
Mammals of Venezuela
Endemic fauna of Venezuela
Mammals described in 1901
Taxa named by Oldfield Thomas
Taxonomy articles created by Polbot